Didier Bouvet (born 6 March 1961) is a French former alpine skier who competed in the 1984 Winter Olympics and in the 1988 Winter Olympics.

Olympics results
In 1984 he won the bronze medal in the slalom event. In the giant slalom competition he finished 14th. Four years later he participated in the 1988 slalom competition but did not finished the race.

References

External links
 
 

1961 births
Living people
French male alpine skiers
Olympic alpine skiers of France
Alpine skiers at the 1984 Winter Olympics
Alpine skiers at the 1988 Winter Olympics
Olympic bronze medalists for France
Olympic medalists in alpine skiing
Medalists at the 1984 Winter Olympics
People from Thonon-les-Bains
Sportspeople from Haute-Savoie
20th-century French people